The 2013 University of North Dakota football team represented the University of North Dakota in the 2013 NCAA Division I FCS football season as a member of the Big Sky Conference. They were led by fifth-year head coach Chris Mussman and played their home games at the Alerus Center. North Dakota the season 3–8 overall and 2–6 in Big Sky play to place tenth.

On November 19, Mussman was fired. He posted a record of 31–36 in six seasons. On December 24, Southern Illinois defensive coordinator Kyle Schweigert was hired as the new North Dakota head coach.

Schedule

Despite Montana also being a member of the Big Sky Conference, the game on September 14 was considered a non-conference game and has no effect on the Big Sky standings.

Game summaries

Valparaiso

South Dakota State

Montana

Montana State

@ Idaho State

Eastern Washington

Sacramento State

@ Portland State

@ Northern Arizona

Northern Colorado

@ UC Davis

References

North Dakota
North Dakota Fighting Hawks football seasons
North Dakota football